Francisco Contreras Serrano (16 June 1934 – 12 July 2022), also known as Pancho Contreras, was a Mexican tennis player. He both played for and captained the Mexico Davis Cup team.

Biography
Born in Mexico City in 1934, Contreras completed his studies in California, attending Modesto Junior College. Along with his Modesto teammate Joaquín Reyes, he went on to play college tennis for the University of Southern California and the pair combined to win the 1955 NCAA doubles championships. He won the NCAA doubles championship again in 1956, this time partnering Peruvian player Alex Olmedo.

Contreras reached the round of 16 at both the 1956 US National Championships and the 1957 French Championships. At the 1958 Wimbledon Championships he partnered with Rosie Reyes to make the semi-finals of the mixed doubles. He won a men's doubles gold medal at the 1959 Central American and Caribbean Games and was a mixed doubles gold medalist at 1963 Pan American Games, partnering Yola Ramírez.

Davis Cup
Contreras debuted for Mexico's Davis Cup team in 1953 and played his 12th and final tie during Mexico's historic run to the 1962 Davis Cup final. He was team captain for Mexico in the 1962 campaign, which included a win over the United States. In order to rest players he featured in two dead rubber singles matches, against Yugoslavia and India, en route to the final. In the final against Australia in Brisbane he remained on the sidelines, as the home side were victorious 5–0.

See also
List of Mexico Davis Cup team representatives

References

External links
 
 
 

1934 births
2022 deaths
Mexican male tennis players
USC Trojans men's tennis players
Pan American Games medalists in tennis
Pan American Games gold medalists for Mexico
Pan American Games silver medalists for Mexico
Pan American Games bronze medalists for Mexico
Tennis players at the 1959 Pan American Games
Tennis players at the 1963 Pan American Games
Central American and Caribbean Games medalists in tennis
Central American and Caribbean Games gold medalists for Mexico
Central American and Caribbean Games silver medalists for Mexico
Competitors at the 1959 Central American and Caribbean Games
Medalists at the 1959 Pan American Games
Medalists at the 1963 Pan American Games
Tennis players from Mexico City
20th-century Mexican people